Medicago constricta is an annual, non-climbing species of the genus Medicago. It is found in the Mediterranean basin from Greece to Israel. M. constricta is found primarily in sandy clay or dry soils. It forms a symbiotic relationship with the bacterium Sinorhizobium meliloti, which is capable of nitrogen fixation.

Gallery

References

constricta